Richard Allen "Rich" Kreitling (March 13, 1936 - May 9, 2020) was a former American football wide receiver who played with the Cleveland Browns of the National Football League (NFL).

Kreitling died on May 9, 2020.

References

1936 births
American football wide receivers
Auburn Tigers football players
Illinois Fighting Illini football players
Players of American football from Chicago
Cleveland Browns players
Chicago Bears players
2020 deaths